Moseley Shoals is the second album by the British rock group Ocean Colour Scene which was released during the Britpop era. The album reached #2 in the UK charts, and amassed 92 weeks on chart, making it the band's most successful album in terms of weeks on chart, despite a later album reaching #1.

Album
The first single taken from the album was "The Riverboat Song", which was popularised by Chris Evans on TFI Friday. "The Day We Caught the Train" reached number four in the charts, with "You've Got It Bad" and "The Circle" also reaching the top 10. "One for the Road" was also due to be released, but the band decided to concentrate on the 1997 album release Marchin' Already. By November 1997, Moseley Shoals had sold over 1.2 million copies worldwide.

The word Moseley is taken from a suburb of the same name in south Birmingham, UK. The album title as a whole is a punning nod to the city of Muscle Shoals, Alabama, the location of several famous 1960s soul recording studios.

The album was produced by Brendan Lynch, and was recorded and mixed at the band's studio in Birmingham (Moseley Shoals).

In April, 2016, the album was re-released as part of the Record Store Day celebrations, on limited edition red vinyl, charting at No.5 on the vinyl album chart.

The memorial by which the band can be seen standing on the front cover is the Jephson Memorial in The Jephson Gardens, Leamington Spa, UK.

Accolades
In 1998, Q magazine's readers voted Moseley Shoals the 33rd greatest album of all time. The album was placed at number 42 on Pitchfork'''s 2017 poll of "The 50 Best Britpop Albums."

Moseley Shoals: Deluxe Edition 
Released on 7 March 2011, the remastered album contained the original track list, plus all the B-sides from the four singles released ("The Riverboat Song", "The Day We Caught the Train", "The Circle" and "You've Got It Bad"). Most of these (all except "You've Got It Bad (demo)", "Men of Such Opinion", "I Need a Love Song" and "Justine") appeared on the B-side compilation album B-sides, Seasides and Freerides''.

Track listing

Personnel
Credits are adapted from the album's liner notes.
Ocean Colour SCene
Simon Fowler – lead vocals, acoustic guitar, harmonica
Steve Cradock – guitar, backing vocals, piano
Damon Minchella – bass
Oscar Harrison – drums, backing vocals, piano
Additional personnel
Paul Weller – organ (track 1), guitar (track 3), piano (track 7), backing vocals (track 7)
Brendan Lynch – production 
Martyn Heyes – engineering
Tony Keach – engineering assistance
Tim Young – mastering
Gerard Saint – sleeve design
Lord Antony Mark Briggs – photography

Charts

Weekly charts

Year-end charts

Certifications

References

External links

Moseley Shoals (deluxe edition) at YouTube (streamed copy where licensed)
 

1996 albums
Ocean Colour Scene albums
MCA Records albums
Moseley